The Tenant (original French title Le Locataire chimérique, in English The Chimeric Tenant) is a novel by Roland Topor, originally published in France in 1964. A film was made after the book by Roman Polanski in 1976. A surrealist horror novel, The Tenant was described by writer John Fowles as a book in "the Kafka tradition."

Plot
The Tenant is the story of a Parisian of Polish descent, an exploration of alienation and identity, asking questions about how we define ourselves.

Trelkovsky, a Parisian man, has been thrown out on the street and desperately needs to find a place to live. He finds an affordable apartment, leased to a girl named Simone Choule, who is in a coma after a suicide attempt in which she jumped out of the windows, screaming. Choule soon dies, and Trelkovsky rents her old apartment. Trelkovsky soon falls prey to paranoid obsessions about his neighbors and dissociates, taking on Choule's identity. Ultimately, he too throws himself out the window. The book ends with Trelkovsky, like Choule before him, waking up in a coma.

Editions
The Tenant, translated by Francis K. Price, Centipede Press, Lakewood: CO, 2010,

References

1964 French novels
Novels set in Paris
French satirical novels
French novels adapted into films
French horror fiction
Roland Topor
Novels adapted into operas